Ms. Stiletto, is a 1969 film directed by Bruno Corbucci.

Plot
Early 1600s, France. Eric von Nutter, a greedy Alsatian baron raids Duke de Frissac's family estate Château Salins and kills his entire family except Isabella, his little daughter. Isabella is saved by Melicour, the head of a gypsy tribe nicknamed The Devils. Years later, Isabella is a beautiful and courageous teenage girl. By chance, she encounters François de Bassompierre and gets the opportunity to reclaim her title but Château Salins is now possessed by Von Nutter. France is going through political instability under the child king Louis XIII and needs support from German princes. Therefore, Isabella is barred from possession of Château Salins by the Louvre and a young viscount, Gilbert de Villancourt is assigned as a guardian to her. However, following a failed assassination attempt by a minion of Von Nutter, Isabella vows to avenge her family and take Château Salins back.

Cast

Background
Ms. Stiletto is an adaptation of the fumetto Isabella, duchessa dei diavoli, a comic book series by Renzo Barbieri, who created the character of Isabella, and Giorgio Cavedon, who wrote the stories. The comic series became popular in Italy and was Italy's first openly erotic comic strip.

The film was part of a minor trend of comic strip adaptations that emphasised mild sado-masochism and late 1960s fetish gear, which started with Danger: Diabolik and Barbarella.

Release
Ms. Stiletto was released in Italy in 1969. The film was released on home video in the United States under the title Ms. Stiletto in the mid 1980s. As of 2016, the film is only available in the United States through a VHS tape from the Force Video label. Italian film historian and critic described this tape as "badly cropped VHS" that is "sold at a very high price among collectors."

See also
 List of Italian films of 1969

References

Footnotes

Sources

External links

1969 films
1960s historical adventure films
Italian historical adventure films
West German films
1960s Italian-language films
Films directed by Bruno Corbucci
Italian sexploitation films
Films set in France
Films set in the 1610s
Italian swashbuckler films
Films based on Italian comics
Live-action films based on comics
1960s Italian films